Proline-rich protein HaeIII subfamily 2 is a protein that in humans is encoded by the PRH2 gene.

References

Further reading 

 
 
 
 
 
 
 
 
 

Salivary proline-rich proteins